Lang'ata is a predominantly middle-class 
residential suburb of Nairobi in Kenya. The suburb consists of many smaller housing developments, referred to as estates. They include Nairobi Dam,  Otiende, Southlands, Ngei, Jambo estate, Onyonka, Madaraka Estate, Kutch Prant, Rubia, NHC Langata, Akiba, Sun Valley, Royal Park and many others. These developments are primarily maisonettes or apartment blocks.

Location

It lies mainly along the similarly named Langata Road, which runs from the Mombasa Road junction at Nyayo Stadium to Karen Shopping Centre, at the Ngong Road junction. However, the area known as Langata terminates at the  Magadi Road Junction at the Galleria Mall. The coordinates of Lang'ata are:1°21'58.0"S, 36°44'17.0"E (Latitude:-1.366111; Longitude:36.738056).

Overview
Lang'ata has several attractions such as the Giraffe Centre, the Uhuru Gardens, and a tourist village Bomas of Kenya. Lang'ata also has the Carnivore Restaurant and adjoining Carnivore grounds, where concerts are hosted. Wilson Airport, the largest private airport in Kenya, can also be found in Lang'ata.

Lang'ata is also name of the Langata Constituency, which covers affluent estates Karen and Lang'ata, but numerically most its voters come from Kibera, the largest slum in Kenya. Langata Constituency has now been subdivided to two constituencies; namely Langata and Kibera Constituencies.

Education 
 Strathmore University located in Madaraka Estate
 The Nairobi Japanese School is located in the Lang'ata area.
 The main campus of Catholic University of Eastern Africa is located in Langata.
 The area is home to several primary and secondary schools, including the Brookhouse School, a private, co-educational day and residential secondary school.
 Sunshine Secondary School, which is located besides Dam Estate.
 Amref International University which is located opposite Wilson Airport.

There are also several primary schools in the area, both public and private. These include;
 Langata West Primary School, located in Ngei I.
 Langata Road Primary School found along the similarly named road, right opposite Wilson Airport and adjacent to Weston Hotel.
 Uhuru Gardens Primary, located opposite the Uhuru Gardens.
 Ngei Primary School, located in Ngei II, next to Southlands Estate.
 Briar Rose Academy, a private kindergarten and primary school located between Royal Park Estate and Sun Valley Estate.
 PCEA Langata Junior School, a private school.
 Langata High School, a public secondary school found in the Southlands Area.

Notable landmarks
 Nyayo National Stadium, a multipurpose sports complex.
 Wilson Airport, a hub for small and medium passenger aircraft plying both local and regional (East African) routes.
 T- Mall, a shopping and recreation complex situated at the junction of Mbagathi and Langata Roads
 Langata Army Barracks, home to Maroon Commandos.
 Kenya Wildlife Service headquarters at the Nairobi National Park.

References

Further reading
 De Lame, Danielle. "Grey Nairobi: Sketches of Urban Socialities." In: Charton-Bigot, Hélène and Deyssi Rodriguez-Torres (editors). Nairobi Today: The Paradox of a Fragmented City. African Books Collective, 2010. p. 167-214. , 9789987080939. The source edition is an English translation, published by Mkuki na Nyota Publishers Ltd.  of Dar es Salaam, Tanzania in association with the French Institute for Research in Africa (IFRA)  The book was originally published in French as Nairobi contemporain: Les paradoxes d'une ville fragmentée, Karthala Editions (Hommes et sociétés, ISSN 0993-4294). French version article: "Gris Nairobi: Esquisses de sociabilités urbaines." p. 221-284. , 9782845867871.
 Includes a section on Karen and Langata, titled "Karen and Langata: Gardens and Suburbs", p. 174-179 (In French: "Karen et Langata, jardins et faubourgs", p. 231-237).

External links

Populated places in Kenya
Suburbs of Nairobi